Poul Sørensen may refer to:

 Poul Sørensen (cyclist) (1906-1951), Danish cyclist
 Poul Sørensen (handball) (born 1954), Danish handball player